Huacaraje Airport  is an airport adjacent to the town of Huacaraje in the Beni Department of Bolivia.

See also

Transport in Bolivia
List of airports in Bolivia

References

External links 
OpenStreetMap - Huacaraje
OurAirports - Huacaraje
Fallingrain - Huacaraje Airport

Airports in Beni Department